James Clark  (born 22 March 1991) is an Australian water polo goalkeeper.

Education
Sydney-based, he was educated at Birchgrove Public School and in his secondary years at Newington College. At the tertiary level he graduated as a Bachelor of Business and Commerce in property from the University of Western Sydney.

Olympics
At the 2012 Summer Olympics, he competed for the Australia men's national water polo team in the men's event. At the time he was 6 ft 5 inches tall.

See also
 Australia men's Olympic water polo team records and statistics
 List of men's Olympic water polo tournament goalkeepers

References

External links
 

1991 births
Living people
Australian male water polo players
Water polo goalkeepers
Olympic water polo players of Australia
Water polo players at the 2012 Summer Olympics
People educated at Newington College